Holcocerus nobilis is a moth in the family Cossidae. It was first described by Staudinger in 1884. It is found in Kazakhstan, Uzbekistan, Kirghizstan, Tajikistan, Turkmenistan, China, Iran and Afghanistan. The habitat consists of deserts and semi-deserts.

Adults are on wing in summer, probably in two generations per year.

References

Natural History Museum Lepidoptera generic names catalog

Cossinae
Moths described in 1884
Moths of Asia